The 2018–19 Cal State Bakersfield Roadrunners men's basketball team represented California State University, Bakersfield in the 2018–19 NCAA Division I men's basketball season. The Roadrunners were led by eighth-year head coach Rod Barnes and competed at the Icardo Center. CSU Bakersfield was a member of the Western Athletic Conference. They finished the season 18–16, 7–9 in WAC play to finish in a tie for fifth place. They lost in the quarterfinals of the WAC tournament to Texas–Rio Grande Valley. They were invited to the CollegeInsider.com Tournament where they defeated Cal State Fullerton in the first round to win the Riley Wallace Classic and defeated Southern Utah in the second round before losing in the quarterfinals to Green Bay.

Before the season

The Roadrunners finished 12–18 overall, and 5–9 in the conference. During the season, the Roadrunners participated in the Great Alaska Shootout, which was held in Anchorage, Alaska. The Roadrunners finished as a runner–up from defeating Alaska Anchorage and Idaho but losing to Central Michigan. In the postseason, CSU Bakersfield lost to Utah Valley in the quarterfinals of the 2018 WAC men's basketball tournament in Paradise, Nevada.

Roster

Schedule

|-
!colspan=12 style=""| Regular season

|-
!colspan=9 style=|WAC tournament

|-
!colspan=12 style=|CollegeInsider.com Postseason tournament
|-

References

Cal State Bakersfield Roadrunners men's basketball seasons
Cal State Bakersfield
Cal State Bakersfield
Cal State Bakersfield
Cal State Bakersfield